Pillans is a surname. Notable people with the surname include: 

Albert Pillans (1869–1901), English cricketer
Francis Pillans (1810–1889), member of the New Zealand Legislative Council 
James Pillans (1778–1864), Scottish classical scholar and educational reformer
Mat Pillans (born 1991), South African cricketer
Robert Pillans (1860–1941), Scottish-born Australian politician